Armitage Manufacturing Company, also known as Fibre Board Container Company, is a historic factory building located in Richmond, Virginia.  The original section was built in 1900, and is a two-story, brick building; a third story was added in 1924. Around 1928, a three-story extension was constructed at the rear of the front wing. In 1954, a large barrel-roofed, metal bowstring truss wing was added. It was constructed for the production of building supplies and roofing paper, and then used for corrugated container manufacturing. The building is used as a warehouse.

It was listed on the National Register of Historic Places in 2012.

References

Industrial buildings and structures on the National Register of Historic Places in Virginia
Industrial buildings completed in 1900
Buildings and structures in Richmond, Virginia
National Register of Historic Places in Richmond, Virginia
Packaging companies of the United States